, also known as Neon Genesis Evangelion: Iron Maiden, is a video game based on the Gainax anime/manga series Neon Genesis Evangelion, released officially only in Japan for the PlayStation, Sega Saturn, PlayStation 2, PSP, Windows (PC), and Macintosh. On January 20, 2005, a legacy game titled Neon Genesis Evangelion: Girlfriend of Steel 2nd was released for the PlayStation 2. While it does feature much of the cast of the original game, the story is unrelated to the original's.

Releases
The original version was released by Gainax for Microsoft Windows PCs in 1997.  Subsequently, the Macintosh version was released in response to requests from Mac users.  In April 2006, a special edition was released for the PS2 and the PC as part of Evangelion's ten-year anniversary, with additional scenes focusing on the TRIDENT pilots' lives.  On April 9, 2009, a version for the PlayStation Portable was released.

Story
Fourteen-year-old Mana Kirishima (voiced by Megumi Hayashibara) is transferred to Shinji Ikari's school, and almost immediately they begin to establish a special relationship. This provokes much jealousy in Asuka, who also suspects that Mana is a spy who is trying to get information from Shinji about NERV and the Evas. Rei Ayanami is present but plays a rather background role in the story, though she seems to agree with the suspicions of Asuka. Gradually, a relationship between Mana and Shinji unfolds and they end up going on a date. It turns out, however, that Mana is one of three test pilots for the TRIDENT (alternatively named the "Country Crawler") units, a new competitor to the Evangelions, similar to Jet Alone; thus the name Girlfriend of Steel. Eventually, the TRIDENT goes berserk and the Evas have to destroy it.

The interactivity in most of the game is limited to walking around areas until the next plot event is triggered. However, the one true branch occurs at the end of the game, where the player may choose to focus on Mana, Asuka or Kaji. This choice determines which of the game's three endings are shown, with a fourth exclusive to the PS2.

In the Mana ending, Mana is discovered not to have been killed in the battle. Shinji rescues her and brings her back to his apartment. She showers, emerges wearing only a towel, and teasingly asks Shinji if he would like her to remove it (which she eventually does). In discussion with Misato, however, it is agreed that Mana has to leave Tokyo-3, and she says a teary goodbye to Shinji who has won her heart.

In the Asuka ending, Asuka helps Shinji to get over Mana and the two children grow closer as a result. This ending contains romantic images of Asuka and Shinji together, including a moving scene where Asuka hugs Shinji emotionally.

The third ending with Kaji does not focus on any one character as much as the other endings do. Mana is also discovered not to be killed, and says goodbye, with Shinji replying "I'll be waiting for you".

There is also an additional ending, exclusive to the PS2 release of the game. In it, seeking shelter from the rain, Shinji tries to forget his problems, and Mana, with a drink. He eventually falls in the trash outside and is found by Mana. After drying his clothes, the two spend the night together and express their feelings for one another. Mana eventually ends up with NERV, after a lot of paperwork, so she can be with Shinji. Asuka has moved on with her life and the final shot is Shinji and Mana holding hands as Mana says 'thank you'.

The ending song is yokan ("Premonition"), sung by Yoko Takahashi.

Reception
Girlfriend of Steel won the 1997 "Best Interactive Software" Animation Kobe award. The PlayStation Portable version of the game sold 4,603 copies the week of its release.

References

External links

  Official site
  Mana Kirishima: Review
  Information on the Special Edition
 Includes translations of the various endings

1997 video games
Classic Mac OS games
CyberFront games
Gainax
Japan-exclusive video games
Neon Genesis Evangelion games
PlayStation (console) games
PlayStation 2 games
PlayStation Portable games
Sega Saturn games
Single-player video games
Video games developed in Japan
Visual novels
Windows games